O Premave may refer to:
 O Premave (1999 film), an Indian Kannada-language romance drama film
 O Premave (2018 film), an Indian Kannada-language romantic drama film